Vilimoni Waqatabu Delasau (born 12 July 1977 in Sorokaba, Ba) is a Fijian former rugby union footballer. He played as a wing. His nickname is Delz.

Early career
He grew up in the Town of Ba and he played for Lautoka in the National Provincial Rugby Tournament in Fiji. He was picked to represent Fiji in the Rugby Sevens. He scored 85 tries for the Fiji sevens. In 1999 Delasau was named Player of the Year at the Fiji Rugby Awards after scoring 82 tries in the season. He earned his first Test cap against the US Eagles in June 2000 after impressing in the sevens form of the game the previous year. He also holds the record for scoring the most tries in a sevens game with 6 tries, and also the record of most tries in a tournament with 16 tries, ahead of fellow Fijian winger, Rupeni Caucau on 14 tries.

Europe
He then went to Japan and played there for two years before going to France and playing for the Mont-de-Marsan rugby club where he played 5 games for them scoring 3 tries. After that he returned to Fiji and was chosen to represent the Canterbury in the NPC. He later represented the Crusaders in the Super 12 competition and in late 2005, he represented the Highlanders in the Super 14 competition. After his short stint, he moved to France to join ASM Clermont Auvergne where he represented them in the Top 14 and in the ECC competition. He scored a few good tries for clermont including a 90-metre run against London Wasps in the 2007–08 Heineken Cup which was awarded the try of the season. He joined his new club, US Montauban after his contract with Clermont expired and he chose not to renew it.

He represented Fiji in the 2003 and 2007 Rugby World Cup and some said he was the best right winger in the competition. In the 2007 World Cup he scored one of the tries as Fiji defeated Wales to reach their first quarter final in 20 years, and he also scored a try in the quarter final defeat to South Africa. He was also part of the Fiji sevens at the 2001, 2005 and 2009 Rugby World Cup Sevens.

Later career
In April 2010 he joined Toulouse as a medical joker as they suffered numerous injuries. Montauban suffered a points deduction for financial irregularities and will be relegated at the end of the 2009/2010 season. He scored his first try against Castres on just his second game for his new team.

In February 2012, he retired from International rugby.

References

External links
 Crusaders profile
  Montauban profile
  Toulouse profile
 
 

1977 births
Living people
People from Ba (town)
Doping cases in rugby union
Fijian rugby union players
Fijian sportspeople in doping cases
Rugby union wings
Canterbury rugby union players
Crusaders (rugby union) players
Highlanders (rugby union) players
ASM Clermont Auvergne players
Stade Toulousain players
Fiji international rugby union players
Pacific Islanders rugby union players
Fijian expatriate rugby union players
Expatriate rugby union players in New Zealand
Expatriate rugby union players in France
Expatriate rugby union players in Japan
Fijian expatriate sportspeople in New Zealand
Fijian expatriate sportspeople in France
Fijian expatriate sportspeople in Japan
Fiji international rugby sevens players
Male rugby sevens players
I-Taukei Fijian people
Commonwealth Games medallists in rugby sevens
Commonwealth Games silver medallists for Fiji
Commonwealth Games rugby sevens players of Fiji
Rugby sevens players at the 2002 Commonwealth Games
Medallists at the 2002 Commonwealth Games